The Great Britain korfball team is managed by the British Korfball Association (BKA), representing Great Britain in korfball international competitions. 
In 2007 it was split in 3 national teams: England, Wales and Scotland, that compete in all international competitions except the World Games, where they compete as a unified Great Britain and Northern Ireland korfball team. A unified Ireland team is represented separately.

Tournament history

 Since 2007 it was split in 3: England national team, Wales national team and Scotland national team. 

 Since 2007 it was split in 3: England national team, Wales national team and Scotland national team.

See also
 England national korfball team
 Wales national korfball team
 Scotland national korfball team

External links
 British Korfball Association

National korfball teams
Korfball
Korfball teams in the United Kingdom